The 2006 Chennai Open was an ATP men's tennis tournament held on outdoor hard courts in Chennai, India. The tournament was held from 2 January through 9 January 2006. First-seeded Ivan Ljubičić won the singles title.

Finals

Singles

 Ivan Ljubičić defeated  Carlos Moyà 7–6(8–6), 6–2
 It was Ljubičić's 1st title of the year and the 4th of his career.

Doubles

 Michal Mertiňák /  Petr Pála defeated  Prakash Amritraj /  Rohan Bopanna 6–2, 7–5
 It was Mertiňák's 1st title of the year and the 1st of his career. It was Pála's 1st title of the year and the 5th of his career.

References

 
Chennai Open
Chennai Open
2006 in Indian tennis